Oleksandr Serhiyovich Horyainov (born 29 June 1975 in Kharkiv) is a retired Ukrainian professional football goalkeeper and manager. His hobbies are reading and fishing.

In 1996 he debuted for the Ukraine youth team. However it was not until 2010 when Horyainov finally debuted for the senior team. That day he became the oldest debutant for the senior team, surpassing the record set by Oleksandr Horshkov.

Career statistics

References

External links
 
 
Player profile
Profile at soccer.ru

1975 births
Living people
Footballers from Kharkiv
Ukrainian footballers
Ukraine international footballers
Ukraine under-21 international footballers
Association football goalkeepers
FC Olympik Kharkiv players
FC Metalist Kharkiv players
FC Avanhard Merefa players
FC Kryvbas Kryvyi Rih players
FC CSKA Kyiv players
FC Arsenal Kyiv players
FC Metalist-2 Kharkiv players
Ukrainian Premier League players
Ukrainian First League players
Ukrainian Second League players
Ukrainian Amateur Football Championship players
UEFA Euro 2012 players
FC Metalist 1925 Kharkiv players
FC Metalist 1925 Kharkiv managers
Ukrainian football managers
Ukrainian First League managers